Stephanie Balduccini (born 20 September 2004) is a Brazilian swimmer. She competed in the 2020 Summer Olympics at age 16.

She is the daughter of Natalie, a British descendant who was born in Brazil, and Bruno. They both enrolled her in an English language school as a child, so the first language she learned was English, not Portuguese, which she later mastered. She began her career at Paineiras do Morumby club as a child. Her first international experience came in 2019, with the South American Youth Championship. She stood out by winning the 50-metre freestyle event in Chile. In the 2020 Brasil Swimming Trophy, he won the 50m freestyle event in the skins format.

International career

2020 Summer Olympics
Balduccini qualified for Tokyo 2020 as the youngest Olympic swimmer in Brazil in 41 years (Ricardo Prado competed in Moscow in 1980 at the age of 15). The Paineiras club swimmer was responsible for the last partial, in Brazil's time-taking, at the Olympic selective in April at Parque Maria Lenk in Rio de Janeiro. She helped the team finish fourth in the world repechage, with a time of 3:38.59, and stamp their passport to Tokyo.

At the 2020 Brazilian Olympic selective, she swam the 100 metre freestyle with a time of 55.03, a time that would be enough for a silver medal in the 2021 European Junior Championships.

At the 2020 Summer Olympics in Tokyo, Balduccini closed the Brazilian Women's 4 × 100 metre freestyle relay at heats, with a partial of 54.06 (the best in the team).

2021–24
In April 2022, she clocked a personal best of 1:57.77 to win the women’s 200 free at the Brazil Trophy, close to the South American record (1:57.28 obtained by Manuella Lyrio). She also clocked 54.64 in the 100m freestyle, a time close to Larissa Oliveira's South American record of 54.03.

At the age of 17, she was at the 2022 World Aquatics Championships held in Budapest, Hungary. Participating in the Brazilian 4x100m freestyle relay, formed by Ana Carolina Vieira, Giovanna Diamante, Balduccini and Giovana Reis, she finished in 6th place with a time of 3:38.10. This was the first time Brazil had qualified a women's relay for a World Aquatics Championships final since 2009, and the best placement of the country in this race in Worlds at all times. She became the first Brazilian to go sub-54 in the women’s 4x100 freestyle relay.  In the 200m freestyle, she qualified for the semifinals in 8th place, with a time of 1:57.81.  In the semifinals, she finished in 12th place, with a time of 1:57.54, her best personal time, 0.26 s from the South American record, and the best placement in the history of Brazil in this competition at World Championships. In the 100m freestyle, she qualified for the semifinals in 15th place, with a time of 54.48. In the semifinals, she finished in 10th place, with a time of 54.10, her best personal time, 0.07 s from the South American record and the best placement in the history of Brazil in this competition at World Championships. In the Brazilian 4x200m freestyle relay, formed by Balduccini, Giovanna Diamante, Aline Rodrigues and Maria Paula Heitmann, she finished in 6th place with a time of 7:58.38. This was the best placement of Brazil in this race in Worlds at all times.  In the 4 × 100 metre mixed freestyle relay, she finished 6th in the final, along with Gabriel Santos, Vinicius Assunção and Giovanna Diamante, breaking the South American record and equaling the best mark in Brazil obtained in 2015.  In the 4 × 100 metre mixed medley relay, she finished 9th along with Guilherme Basseto, João Gomes Júnior and Giovanna Diamante. She also finished 19th in the Women's 200 metre individual medley.

At the 2022 FINA World Swimming Championships (25 m), in Melbourne, Australia, in the Women's 4 × 200 metre freestyle relay, she broke the South American record with a time of 7:48.42, along with Giovanna Diamante, Gabrielle Roncatto and Aline Rodrigues. Brazil's relay finished 7th in the final.  She also finished 8h in the Mixed 4 × 50 metre freestyle relay final, 9th in the Women's 4 × 100 metre freestyle relay, 16th in the Women's 100 metre freestyle and in the Women's 200 metre freestyle, 20th in the Women's 100 metre individual medley, 25th in the Women's 200 metre individual medley and 28th in the Women's 50 metre freestyle.

Personal bests

References

2004 births
Living people
Sportspeople from São Paulo
Brazilian people of British descent
Swimmers at the 2020 Summer Olympics
Brazilian female freestyle swimmers
Olympic swimmers of Brazil
21st-century Brazilian women
Competitors at the 2022 South American Games
South American Games medalists in swimming
South American Games gold medalists for Brazil
South American Games bronze medalists for Brazil